David Joseph may refer to:

David Joseph (basketball), Canadian basketball coach
David Joseph (executive), English corporate executive
David C. Joseph (born 1977), American judge

See Also
Dave Joseph (born 1969), West Indian cricketer